The 2008–09 All-Ireland Junior Club Hurling Championship was the sixth staging of the All-Ireland Junior Club Hurling Championship since its establishment by the Gaelic Athletic Association.

The All-Ireland final was played on 15 February 2009 at Croke Park in Dublin, between Dripsey from Cork and Tullogher-Rosbercon from Kilkenny, in what was their first ever meeting in the final. Dripsey won the match by 2-15 to 0-18 to claim their first ever championship title.

Munster Junior Club Hurling Championship

Munster quarter-finals

Munster semi-finals

 Kilgarvan received a bye in this round as there were no Clare representatives.

Munster final

All-Ireland Junior Club Hurling Championship

All-Ireland quarter-final

All-Ireland semi-finals

All-Ireland final

Championship statistics

Miscellaneous

 Skehana became the first team to three Connacht Championship titles.

References

All-Ireland Junior Club Hurling Championship
All-Ireland Junior Club Hurling Championship
All-Ireland Junior Club Hurling Championship